Parks and open spaces in Cornwall
King G
Cornwall
Lists of buildings and structures in Cornwall